The (89 FV ) is a Japanese infantry fighting vehicle that entered service with the Japan Ground Self-Defense Force in 1989. There were 58 vehicles in service  and a total of 120 produced by 2014 with 300 planned. The main armament of the vehicle is an Oerlikon Contraves 35 millimeter KDE cannon.

Development
Development of the Type 89 began in 1980, with four prototypes being produced in 1984. These prototypes were tested until 1986. It was accepted into service and type classified in 1989. When the vehicle entered production, the initial requirement was for around 300 vehicles. The primary contractor for the project was Mitsubishi Heavy Industries, with the main subcontractor being Komatsu Limited.

Description

The vehicle is of relatively conventional layout with a welded steel hull. The 600 horsepower Mitsubishi 6SY31WA water-cooled diesel engine located in the front left of the hull. It drives an automatic transmission which in turn drives the track via drive sprockets at the front of the hull. On each side of the hull are six road wheels with an idler at the rear, and three track return rollers. The suspension is a torsion bar system.

The driver sits to the right of the engine, with a single-piece hatch above him that opens to the right. The driver is provided with three fixed vision periscopes, and a single traversable periscope in the hatch. A passive night vision periscope can be used in place of one of the day periscopes. A single infantry man sits behind the driver and has a hatch immediately above him with two vision periscopes that provide coverage of the front of the hull, as well as a large spherical firing port on the right side of the hull.

In the center of the hull is the two-man turret which mounts the Oerlikon Contraves KD-series 35 millimeter caliber dual-feed cannon with a cyclic rate of fire of approximately 200 rounds per minute, which is produced under license in Japan. Coaxially mounted to the cannon is a Type 74 7.62 millimeter caliber machine gun. The turret also mounts a single Type 79 Jyu-MAT missile on each side of the turret. Underneath the missile launcher is an array of four smoke grenade launchers.

The gunner sits on the left of the turret, with the commander to his right with hatches that open to the rear. Both are provided with telescopic sights mounted on the front of the turret. The gunner has two vision periscopes that cover the front and left of the turret. The commander has six periscopes that provide all-round coverage. The turret is also fitted with a laser warning system.

At the rear of the hull is the main troop compartment that seats seven infantrymen. The troops enter through two large doors which swing open to the side. The troop compartment has seven firing ports: three on the left, one of the right rear exit door, three on the right side. Each of the firing ports is provided with a vision periscope mounted above it.

Operators 
Japan

 Japan Ground Self-Defense Force
 Ordnance School
 Fuji School
 Fuji School(Combined Training)Brigade
 Infantry School Regiment(Mechanized)
  Northern Army
  7th Division
 11th Infantry Regiment(Mechanized)
 Northern Army Combined Brigade
 1st Sergeant Training Unit

Variants

This hull was used by Mitsubishi as the basis for the Type 99 155 mm self-propelled howitzer introduced in 1999.  The engine was kept, but the chassis was lengthened by one road wheel to accommodate extra weight of the heavy artillery piece.

See also
 Turkish Tulpar IFV
 Argentinean VCTP
 British Warrior tracked armoured vehicle
 Chinese ZBD97 Type 97
 French Véhicule blindé de combat d'infanterie
 German Schutzenpanzer Marder
 German Schutzenpanzer Puma
 India Abhay IFV
 Italian Dardo IFV
 Polish 
 Russian BMP-3 IFV
 Singaporean Bionix AFV
 South Korean K21
 Spanish Pizarro IFV
 Swedish CV90 IFV
 US M2 Bradley IFV
 Iranian Makran IFV

References

External links 

 Official JGSDF Page.

Japan Ground Self-Defense Force
Tracked infantry fighting vehicles
Infantry fighting vehicles of Japan
Armoured fighting vehicles of the Cold War
Cold War military equipment of Japan
Type 89
Komatsu Limited
Military vehicles introduced in the 1980s